The Battle of Fort Anderson, also known as the Battle of Deep Gully, took place March 13–15, 1863, in Craven County, North Carolina, as part of Confederate Lt. Gen. James Longstreet's Tidewater operations during the American Civil War.

Lt. Gen. Longstreet took charge of the Department of Virginia and North Carolina on February 25 and initiated his Tidewater Operations. He directed Maj. Gen. D.H. Hill, commander of the North Carolina District, to advance on the Union stronghold of New Bern with about 12,000 men. Maj. Gen. William H. C. Whiting, who commanded the Wilmington garrison, refused to cooperate. After an initial success at Deep Gully on March 13, Hill sent Brig. Gen. J. Johnston Pettigrew against the well-entrenched Federals at Fort Anderson on March 14–15, the opposite side of the river from New Bern. Pettigrew was forced to retire upon the arrival of Union gunboats. The city's garrison was heavily reinforced, and Hill withdrew to threaten Washington, North Carolina.

After Gen. Pettigrew’s withdraw, General Hill was forced to remove his troops from New Bern and head to Washington, NC. The mission was not a complete failure; General Hill was able to fill wagons with food supplies for the troops from areas that were not guarded by Union forces.

References

External links 
 War of the Rebellion: Serial 026 Pages 0183-198 Chapter XXX
 National Park Service Battle Summary
 CWSAC Battle Update

Battles of Longstreet's Tidewater Campaign of the American Civil War
Battles of the Eastern Theater of the American Civil War
Craven County, North Carolina
Union victories of the American Civil War
Battles of the American Civil War in North Carolina
Conflicts in 1863
1863 in North Carolina
March 1863 events